Crandon Municipal Airport, also known as Steve Conway Municipal Airport,  is a city owned public use airport located 3 miles (5 km) southwest of the central business district of Crandon, a city in Forest County, Wisconsin, United States. It is included in the Federal Aviation Administration (FAA) National Plan of Integrated Airport Systems for 2021–2025, in which it is categorized as a basic general aviation facility.

Although most airports in the United States use the same three-letter location identifier for the FAA and International Air Transport Association (IATA), this airport is assigned Y55 by the FAA but has no designation from the IATA.

Facilities and aircraft 
Crandon Municipal Airport covers an area of 259 acres (105 ha) at an elevation of 1650 feet (503 m) above mean sea level. It has two runways: 12/30 is 3,550 by 75 feet (1,082 x 23 m) with an asphalt surface and 1/19 is 2,742 by 100 feet (836 x 30 m) with a turf surface.

For the 12-month period ending August 20, 2020, the airport had 4,400 aircraft operations, an average of 12 per day: 91% general aviation and 9% air taxi.

In February 2023, there were 9 aircraft based at this airport: all 9 single-engine.

2016 improvement project 
Between January and June 2016, the airport completed a $70,000 improvement project that was approved by Governor Scott Walker. The first part of the project was the construction of a six bay T-hangar. The airport was shut down for a few days in June to complete crack filling work on all pavements.

See also
List of airports in Wisconsin

References

External links 
 

Airports in Wisconsin
Buildings and structures in Forest County, Wisconsin